Frank or Francis Hoffmann may refer to:

Frank Hoffmann (actor) (1938–2022), German-Austrian actor
Francis Hoffmann (1822–1903), clergyman and writer
Frank Hoffmann (director), see 1954 in Luxembourg
Frank Hoffmann (Canadian football) (born 1980), Canadian football player

See also
Frank Hoffman (disambiguation)
Frank Simon Hofmann (1916–1989), New Zealand photographer